Satin Doll is an album by American pianist, composer and bandleader Red Garland which was recorded in 1959 but not released on the Prestige label until 1971.

Reception

The Allmusic review by Scott Yanow stated: "This out-of-print LP released for the first time five unknown selections featuring pianist Red Garland in a trio... making this an album of interest to Red Garland completists".

Track listing
All compositions by Red Garland except as indicated
 "Satin Doll" (Duke Ellington, Johnny Mercer, Billy Strayhorn) - 9:45 
 "The Man I Love" (George Gershwin, Ira Gershwin) - 10:43
 "A Little Bit of Basie" - 5:36
 "It's a Blue World" (George Forrest, Robert Wright) - 7:08  
 "M-Squad Theme" (Count Basie) - 6:28
Recorded at Van Gelder Studio in Englewood Cliffs New Jersey on August 12, 1959 (tracks 1-3) and The Prelude Club in New York City on October 2, 1959 (tracks 4 & 5)

Personnel
Red Garland - piano
Jimmy Rowser - (tracks 4 & 5), Doug Watkins (tracks 1-3) - bass
Charles "Specs" Wright - drums

References 

1971 albums
Red Garland albums
Prestige Records albums
Albums produced by Orrin Keepnews
Albums recorded at Van Gelder Studio